The Formula 3 Brazil Open, also known as the F3 Brazil Open, was an annual open wheel racing event at the grand prix circuit of Autódromo José Carlos Pace (Interlagos) in São Paulo, Brazil. The inaugural meeting took place in January 2010. In 2015, the cancellation was announced due to the renovation of Interlagos, but has not been done after that.

The rules and regulations are the same as used in the long-running Formula Three Sudamericana series, using Dallara chassis fitted with 260 bhp Berta engines and Pirelli tyres. The event is open to drivers of any nationality who are of Formula Three standard.

There are four races during the weekend but from the final one only will the winner be crowned: the first three act as qualifying races to decide the grid for the final race.

Scoring system
The grid for the first two races are determined by the results of the Friday qualifying session, with the fastest driver on pole for both races. Points are awarded in both races 1 and 2 to each driver, as shown below:

The grid for Race 3 is defined by the total scores of each driver from the first two races, with the driver who scored the fewest points (from having the best results) going on pole position. In the event of a tie, the driver who finished best in Race 2 is given grid priority. The grid for Race 4 (the final, main race) is determined just by the finishing order of Race 3.

Results

See also
 Formula 3 Sudamericana
 Fórmula 3 Brasil
 Formula Three

References

External links
 Official website of the Formula 3 Brazil Open

 
Formula Three races
Defunct sports competitions in Brazil
Recurring sporting events established in 2010
Recurring sporting events disestablished in 2014
2010 establishments in Brazil
2014 disestablishments in Brazil
Motorsport competitions in Brazil